Roman Častoral (born September 6, 1976) is a Czech rallycross driver. He has previously won the 2006 EuroRX Division 2 Championship.

Racing record

Complete FIA European Rallycross Championship results

Division 1*

* ''Division 1 was rebranded as Division 2 in 1997.

Division 2

Touringcar

References

Living people
Czech rally drivers
1976 births
European Rallycross Championship drivers
People from Strakonice
Sportspeople from the South Bohemian Region